Leonardo "Léo" Gonçalves Martins Netto (born 25 March 1989 in Santos, São Paulo ) is a Brazilian professional footballer who plays for Portuguesa as an attacking midfielder.

References

1989 births
Living people
Brazilian footballers
Campeonato Brasileiro Série A players
Campeonato Brasileiro Série B managers
São Paulo FC players
Toledo Esporte Clube players
Rio Branco Esporte Clube players
Mogi Mirim Esporte Clube players
Botafogo Futebol Clube (SP) players
Guaratinguetá Futebol players
Agremiação Sportiva Arapiraquense players
Associação Atlética Internacional (Limeira) players
Clube Atlético Juventus players
Marília Atlético Clube players
Murici Futebol Clube players
Associação Atlética Portuguesa (Santos) players
Associação Portuguesa de Desportos players
Association football midfielders
Brazilian football managers
Sportspeople from Santos, São Paulo
21st-century Brazilian people